Adoration is respect, reverence, strong admiration, or love in a certain person, place, or thing. The term comes from the Latin adōrātiō, meaning "to give homage or worship to someone or something".

Ancient Rome
In classical Rome, adoration was primarily an act of homage or worship, which, among the Romans, was performed by raising the hand to the mouth, kissing it and then waving it in the direction of the adored object. The devotee had his head covered, and after the act turned himself round from left to right. Sometimes he kissed the feet or knees of the images of the gods themselves, and Saturn and Hercules were adored with the head bare. By a natural transition the homage, at first paid to divine beings alone, came to be paid to monarchs. Thus the Greek and Roman emperors were adored by bowing or kneeling, laying hold of the imperial robe, and presently withdrawing the hand and pressing it to the lips, or by putting the royal robe itself to the lips.

Ancient Middle East
In Eastern countries, adoration has been performed in an attitude still more lowly. The Persian method, introduced by Cyrus the Great, was to kiss the knee and fall on the face at the prince's feet, striking the earth with the forehead and kissing the ground. This striking of the earth with the forehead, usually a fixed number of times, was a form of adoration sometimes paid to Eastern potentates.

The Jews kissed in homage, as did other groups mentioned in the Old Testament. Thus in 1 Kings 19:18, God is made to say, "Yet I have left me seven thousand in Israel, all the knees which have not bowed unto Baal, and every mouth which hath not kissed him." And in Psalms 2:12, "Kiss the Son, lest he be angry, and ye perish from the way". (See also Hosea 13:2.)

Western Europe
In Western Europe, the ceremony of kissing the sovereign's hand, and some other acts which are performed while kneeling, may be described as forms of adoration.

Catholic Church
Adoration may take the form of Eucharistic adoration. Pope Benedict XVI reflected on this: "Only in adoration can profound and true acceptance develop. And it is precisely this personal act of encounter with the Lord that develops the social mission which is contained in the Eucharist and desires to break down barriers, not only the barriers between the Lord and us but also and above all those that separate us from one another". In a similar vein Pope Francis wrote: "The perpetual adoration of the Eucharist [is] growing at every level of ecclesial life. Even so, we must reject the temptation to offer a privatized and individualistic spirituality which ill accords with the demands of charity" (Evangelii gaudium, 262), Some churches contain "adoration chapels" in which the Eucharist is exposed for adoration continuously that the faithful may observe their faith through it. "The Curé of Ars would spend hours in front of the Blessed Sacrament. When people would ask him what he would do or say during those hours, he would say: 'He looks at me, and I look at him.'"

See also

 Hand-kissing
 Kowtow
 Proskynesis
 Prostration

Notes

Prayer
Interpersonal relationships
Christian practices
Emotions